Jon Beedle (born Jonathan Shanon Beedle, 1 March 1961, Hemel Hempstead) is a British guitarist and songwriter.

Beedle is a freelance guitarist and songwriter, specialising in the rock, jazz, blues and jazz fusion genres. He has collaborated with many musicians, including Deep Purple keyboard player Don Airey, and the saxophonist Snake Davis.

He is also a full-time member of the band, Secret Green, and endorses Sabre Guitars.

Discography

Albums
Jon Beedle - Long Time Coming (2005) (Electric Boogie Productions)
Secret Green - To Wake The King (2009) (Holyground HG137)

References

1961 births
Living people
English songwriters
English rock guitarists
English male guitarists
People from Hemel Hempstead
Secret Green members
British male songwriters